Koberg Castle (Kobergs slott)  is a castle in Västergötland, Sweden. It is the residence of Princess Désirée, Baroness Silfverschiöld and her late husband Baron  Nicklas Silfverschiöld  (1934–2017). 

Koberg is located near the lake Vanderydsvattnet, about 10 km south of Trollhättan. 
The castle is a three-storey building of stone flanked by two solid domed round towers. The main building  was restored in the style of  Neo - Renaissance architecture during the 1890s under design by Swedish architect Fredrik Lilljekvist (1863-1932).

See also
List of castles in Sweden

References

External links
Koberg website

Castles in Västra Götaland County